Etelvino Vega Martínez (1906–1939) was a Spanish politician and military officer.

Life
In 1931, he was a member of the central committee of the Communist Party of Spain (PCE). In 1932, after the failed coup of Sanjurjo, he supported the government of the Second Spanish Republic against the will of the Comintern (he launched the slogan “Defence of the Republic"). He and the other members of the central committee were expelled from the party. He lived for some time in the Soviet Union and later he came back to Spain.

After the outbreak of the Spanish Civil War, he fought with the Fifth Regiment in the Somosierra front and later in the Popular Army in the Battle of Guadalajara. After that, he led the 34th division of Heredia’s 18th Army Corps in the Battle of Teruel and the 12th Army Corps in the Battle of Ebro. In March 1939, he was appointed military commander of Alicante, but during Casado’s coup on 6 March he was arrested by the supporters of Casado. After the end of the war, he was captured by the Nationalists, confined in Albatera concentration camp and executed in November 1939. He left his handkerchief to one of his cellmates, asking him a last favour: "It's all I have, you give it to my wife".

Notes

References
Beevor, Antony. (2006). The battle for Spain. The Spanish civil war, 1936–1939. Penguin Books. London. .
 
Thomas, Hugh. (2001). The Spanish Civil War. Penguin Books. London. .

Spanish army officers
Spanish military personnel of the Spanish Civil War (Republican faction)
People executed by Francoist Spain
1906 births
1939 deaths
Executed Spanish people